Luiz Guilherme Vieira da Silva (born 19 February 2003), commonly known as Luizão, is a Brazilian professional footballer who plays as a forward for Al Wasl.

References

External links

2003 births
Living people
Brazilian footballers
Brazilian expatriate footballers
Association football forwards
Coritiba Foot Ball Club players
Tombense Futebol Clube players
Al-Wasl F.C. players
Campeonato Brasileiro Série B players
UAE Pro League players
Expatriate footballers in the United Arab Emirates
Brazilian expatriate sportspeople in the United Arab Emirates